Michael "Michel" Pfeiffer (19 July 1925 – 2 January 2018) was a German professional football player and manager.

Career
Pfeiffer played for SG Eschweiler, Alemannia Aachen, Rot-Weiss Essen and Fortuna 54 Geleen.

He coached Roda JC Kerkrade, Sittardia, SC Schwenningen, Alemannia Aachen, FK Pirmasens, Austria Salzburg, SV Arminia Gütersloh, SV Baesweiler 09, BSV Schwenningen, TuS Langerwehe, Sporting Jeddah and CS Sfax.

References

1925 births
2018 deaths
German footballers
Association football midfielders
Germany international footballers
Alemannia Aachen players
Rot-Weiss Essen players
German football managers
Roda JC Kerkrade managers
FC Red Bull Salzburg managers
Alemannia Aachen managers
BSV 07 Schwenningen managers
CS Sfaxien managers
People from Eschweiler
Sportspeople from Cologne (region)
Footballers from North Rhine-Westphalia
West German footballers
West German football managers
West German expatriate football managers
West German expatriate sportspeople in the Netherlands
West German expatriate footballers
Expatriate footballers in the Netherlands
Expatriate football managers in the Netherlands
Expatriate football managers in Austria
West German expatriate sportspeople in Austria
Expatriate football managers in Tunisia
Expatriate football managers in Saudi Arabia
West German expatriate sportspeople in Tunisia
West German expatriate sportspeople in Saudi Arabia